This is list of the Windows Games on Demand (225) released Games on Demand for the Windows platform, available on the now closed Games for Windows Marketplace.

Released

See also
Xbox 360 Games on Demand
Games for Windows – Live
List of Games for Windows – Live titles
List of Games for Windows titles
Live Anywhere

Notes

References

External links
Games for Windows Marketplace

Microsoft lists
Video game lists